HMS Devonshire was a three-deck 80-gun third rate ship of the line of the Royal Navy, built at Woolwich Dockyard and launched on 12 December 1710. Her design was according to the 1706 Establishment of dimensions as laid down for 80-gun ships.

Devonshire was hulked in 1740, and eventually sold out of the navy in 1760.

Notes

References

Lavery, Brian (2003) The Ship of the Line - Volume 1: The development of the battlefleet 1650-1850. Conway Maritime Press. .

Ships of the line of the Royal Navy
1710s ships